Khawaja Iftikhar Ahmed was a Pakistani professional tennis player who played for British India before independence and  for Pakistan after independence. He was one of the highest ranked players in India from 1940 to 1946, and later retained the position in Pakistan from 1947 to 1956 after the split of Indian subcontinent. He retired from the professional sports in 1962.

The recipient of Tamgha-e-Imtiaz,  a state-organised honour of Pakistan and the Pride of Performance in 1960, he was one of the prominent players in the Indian subcontinent, collectively from 1940 to 1960.

Life and background 
He was born and raised in British India. In 1920 when he was ten years old, he along with his father used to play on a local playground in Chakwal area of Islamabad, and later appeared in tennis when he was a student of 9th grade.

References

External links 
 

Year of birth missing
Place of birth missing
Year of death missing
Place of death missing
Pakistani male tennis players
Recipients of Tamgha-e-Imtiaz
Recipients of the Pride of Performance
Indian male tennis players